{{DISPLAYTITLE:Dolichyl beta-D-glucosyl phosphate}}

Dolichyl β--glucosyl phosphate is a molecule involved in glycosylation.  	It is a polyprenyl glycosyl phosphate having dolichol as the polyprenyl component and β--glucose as the glycosyl component.

See also
 Dolichylphosphate-glucose phosphodiesterase

References

Phospholipids